Goldfish plant is a common name for several plants and may refer to:

 Columnea
 Nematanthus